The women's discus throw event at the 1990 Commonwealth Games was held on 28 January at the Mount Smart Stadium in Auckland.

Results

References

Discus
1990
1990 in women's athletics